Lewis Bridge may refer to:

 Lewis Bridge (Missouri River), in Missouri, United States
 Lewis Bridge (Keya Paha River), Springview, Nebraska and Wewela, South Dakota, United States

See also 
 Lewis Bandt Bridge
 Lewis River (disambiguation)
 Lewis (disambiguation)